Feng Shui is a 2012 Chinese film directed by Jing Wang.

Casts

Main casts
 Yan Bingyan as Li Baoli
 Tommy Shanahan as Johnny

Supporting casts
 Gang Chen as Jianjian
 Minglan He as Ma Xuewu's mother
 Gang Jiao as Ma Xuewu
 Li Xian as Xiaobao, 18 years old
 Moxi Wang as Zhou Fen
 Tiange Wang as Xiaobao, 8 years old
 Qian Zhao as Wan Xiaojing

Awards and nominations

References

Chinese drama films
2012 films
2010s Mandarin-language films